McDonough Park is a stadium in Geneva, New York.  It is primarily used for baseball and was home to the Geneva Cubs.  It holds 3,000 people and opened in 1958.

The ballpark remains serviceable and plays host to two different teams, the Red Wings and the Twins, of the Perfect Game Collegiate Baseball League, a classic example of an old minor-league ballpark that refuses to quit. McDonough "alumni" include Pete Rose.

External links
McDonough Park Views – Ball Parks of the Minor Leagues

Sports venues in Ontario County, New York
Minor league baseball venues
Baseball venues in New York (state)
Geneva, New York
1958 establishments in New York (state)
Sports venues completed in 1958